Klas Henrik Pontus Lund (born 14 February 1968 in Lidingö, Stockholm County) is the Leader of Nordic Strength and a former of the Swedish Nationalist group Svenska motståndsrörelsen (Swedish Resistance Movement) (SMR) now part of the wider movement known as Nordic Resistance Movement (in Swedish Nordiska Motståndsrörelsen, acronym NMR) with presence in Sweden, Norway, Finland and Denmark.

A one-time member of Vitt Ariskt Motstånd (VAM) (in English White Aryan Resistance), Lund has previous convictions for bank robbery and manslaughter.

On 30 November 1999 he was portrayed in Sweden's mainstream media as a major threat to the country's democracy, along with 61 other individuals from various neo-Nazi organizations and motorcycle gangs.

References

External links

1968 births
Alt-right politicians in Europe
Living people
People from Lidingö Municipality
Swedish bank robbers
Swedish neo-Nazis
Swedish people convicted of manslaughter
Swedish prisoners and detainees
Prisoners and detainees of Sweden
People convicted of robbery